Betty Alberge (22 January 1922 – 18 May 1991) was an English theatre, radio and television actress, with an extensive career which ran from the late 1930s to the 1980s. She was best known for her roles as Florrie Lindley in Coronation Street, in which she appeared between 1960 and 1965, and as Edna Cross in Brookside between 1983 and 1985.

Early life
Born in Manchester on 22 January 1922, Alberge received her formal education at Fallowfield Central School for Girls in Manchester. Whilst at school she became interested in acting after performing in a school theatrical production of Maurice Maeterlinck's The Death of Tintagiles, with school friend Patricia Pilkington, later to become known as Pat Phoenix and play Elsie Tanner in Coronation Street.

Acting career
After initial training to be an actress at the Repertory School of Acting in Manchester, Alberge completed her training with the Colwyn Bay Repertory Company, at the New Rialto Theatre in Colwyn Bay. During World War II she was employed as a performer with ENSA. In the 1950s she worked with a wide variety dramatic productions in theatre and with the British Broadcasting Corporation.

Coronation Street 
Alberge was one of the original cast of the television serial drama Coronation Street, playing the character Florrie Lindley from episode one, on Friday 9 December 1960, until 1965 when she left the series. The show's creator, Tony Warren, originally wrote the part of Ida Barlow for Alberge, but after the first audition, he cast her in the role as shopkeeper. Alberge had the distinction of having the second line in the first scene of the first episode: "It's funny having me own name over me own shop, Florrie Lindley". The character let customers believe she was a widow when, in fact, she was estranged from her husband Norman. Under new producer Tim Aspinall, Alberge was written out of the serial in June 1965, after almost 300 episodes, when her character emigrated to Canada with her husband Norman.

Later work 
After she left Coronation Street, Alberge continued to perform in theatre, and regularly appeared as a supporting character actress in television dramas and light entertainment shows from the 1960s to the 1980s, including Z-Cars, the Ken Dodd Show, Crown Court, Rentaghost, Odd Man Out and Juliet Bravo. In November 1983, she joined the cast of Brookside, playing pensioner Edna Cross. She remained in this role until the character's death in 1985, after almost 80 episodes. When Alberge learned that her character was to be written out of the soap, she said "Life goes on."

Her last on screen performance was in 1986 in an episode of the BBC's Casualty.

Personal life
Alberge married Rupert Marshall in Manchester in 1944. The couple had one daughter, Christine, in 1947.

Death
Alberge died on 18 May 1991, aged 69, in Stoke-on-Trent, Staffordshire.

Selected filmography

 Crucible of Terror (1971)
 Disciple of Death (1972)

References

External links

English television actresses
English soap opera actresses
1922 births
1991 deaths
20th-century British actresses
20th-century English women
20th-century English people
20th-century British businesspeople